A Central Mailer can be:
 the coordinator of an amateur press association (APA)
 the distributor of external publications received by a learned society
 an email hub, used by an Electronic mailing list manager or sub-domain coordinator